Francis Clerke (c. 1655 – 2 May 1715) of North Weston, near Thame, Oxfordshire was a British Member of Parliament (MP) for Oxfordshire from 1710 to 1715. 

He was the second son of Sir John Clerke, Bt., of Hitcham, Buckinghamshire and North Weston by Philadelphia, the daughter and coheiress of Sir Edward Carr of Hillingdon, Middlesex. He was educated at Magdalen College, Oxford, becoming a fellow in 1676–1682. 

He married Catherine, the daughter of the Hon Henry Bertie (of Weston-on-the-Green), M.P., of Weston-on-the-Green, Oxfordshire. They had no children.

References

1715 deaths
Year of birth uncertain
People from Oxfordshire
Alumni of Magdalen College, Oxford
Members of the Parliament of Great Britain for English constituencies
British MPs 1710–1713
British MPs 1715–1722